The 2005 Dwars door Vlaanderen was the 60th edition of the Dwars door Vlaanderen cycle race and was held on 23 March 2005. The race started in Kortrijk and finished in Waregem. The race was won by Niko Eeckhout.

General classification

References

2005
2005 in road cycling
2005 in Belgian sport
March 2005 sports events in Europe